Conegliano is a railway station serving the town of Conegliano, in the region of Veneto, northern Italy. The station opened on 1 May 1855 and is located on the Venice–Udine railway and Ponte nelle Alpi-Conegliano railway. The train services are operated by Trenitalia.

Features

The station is equipped, internally, with ticketing service, automatic ticketing, waiting room, bar, newsstand, toilet and snacks area. The railway traffic is managed with an ACC (Central Computerized Apparatus), remotely controlled by the DCO of VE_Mestre.
In addition to the passing tracks, it has a trunk called "Binario 1 giardino", activated to serve the line to Belluno. However, from the activation of electrification on this last section, this track is not used as it is not equipped with an overhead power line.

Train services
The station is served by the following service(s):

High speed services (Frecciarossa) Udine - Treviso - Venice - Padua - Bologna - Florence - Rome
High speed services (Frecciarossa) Udine - Treviso - Venice - Padua - Verona - Milan
Night train (CityNightLine) Munich - Tarvisio - Udine - Treviso - Venice
Night train (EuroNight) Vienna - Linz - Salzburg - Villach - Udine - Treviso - Venice
Night train (Intercity Notte) Trieste - Udine - Venice - Padua - Bologna - Rome
Express services (Regionale Veloce) Trieste - Gorizia - Udine - Treviso - Venice
Regional services (Treno regionale) Trieste - Gorizia - Udine - Treviso - Venice
Local services (Treno regionale) Belluno - Vittorio Veneto - Conegliano - Treviso - Venice

Since October 2019 it has also been served by a pair of Italo AV trains operating between Udine - Rome.

See also

History of rail transport in Italy
List of railway stations in Veneto
Rail transport in Italy
Railway stations in Italy

References

 This article is based upon a translation of the Italian language version as of January 2016.

External links

Railway stations in Veneto